The 2012 Porsche Carrera Cup Great Britain was a multi-event, one make motor racing championship held across England and Scotland. The championship featured a mix of professional motor racing teams and privately funded drivers, competing in Porsche 911 GT3 cars that conform to the technical regulations for the championship. It is a multi class championship, with drivers grouped based on their ability and experience into three classes: Professional, Professional-Amateur 1 (Pro-Am 1)and Professional-Amateur 2 (Pro-Am 2). It forms part of the extensive program of support categories built up around the BTCC centrepiece.

This season was the tenth Porsche Carrera Cup Great Britain. The season commenced on 1 April at Brands Hatch – on the circuit's Indy configuration – and concluded on 21 October at the same venue, utilising the Grand Prix circuit, after twenty races to be held at ten meetings, all in support of the 2012 British Touring Car Championship.

Entry list
The official entry list was released on 13 March, including 21 full-season entries.

Race calendar and results
On 20 September 2011, the British Touring Car Championship announced the race calendar for the 2012 season, for all of the series competing on the TOCA package. All races were held in the United Kingdom.

Championship standings
A driver's best 19 scores counted towards the championship, with any other points being discarded.

References

Porsche Carrera Cup
Porsche Carrera Cup Great Britain seasons